M93 or M-93 may refer to:

 Messier 93, an open star cluster in the constellation Puppis
 Beretta M93R, a selective-fire machine pistol made by the Beretta company
 Zastava M93 Black Arrow, a 12.7 mm Anti-materiel rifle
 M93 Fox, a Chemical, Biological, Radiological and Nuclear reconnaissance vehicle
 M-93 (Michigan highway), a state highway in Michigan
 M93 HORNET mine, an American anti tank mine
 Mannlicher M93, a Romanian service rifle
 Salvator-Dormus M93, early Austro-Hungarian heavy machine gun
 Swiss Mannlicher M93, a Swiss service rifle